Darren Turcotte (born March 2, 1968)  is an American former professional Ice hockey player.

Early life
Turcotte's family moved to North Bay, Ontario where he spent most of his childhood. After his family returned to northern Ontario, he began playing ice hockey at the age of five. He then played six seasons with the Pinehill Coffee Shop 'AAA' minor hockey team, which at the time was coached by his father Don Turcotte. In 1984, now playing in the midget division, Darren scored 60 goals and in that same year he led the Pinehill Coffee Shop win the NOHA, Ontario, and Canadian Midget hockey titles. After his impressive 60 goal season, Darren was drafted to the Ontario Hockey League (OHL) North Bay Centennials in the third round. He played four seasons with the Centennials, averaging 60 points a season with 30 goals and 30 assists. He also made it to the OHL Cup championship final series in 1987, but North Bay lost the series in seven games to the Oshawa Generals. Turcotte finished his OHL career with a record of 128 goals and 150 assists for a total of 278 points with 211 regular season games played.

Professional career
Turcotte was drafted in the 1986 NHL Entry Draft by the New York Rangers in the sixth round, number 114 overall. He made his NHL debut on October 6, 1988, but was sent down to the Denver Rangers of the International Hockey League (IHL). After he scored 49 points in 40 games in the IHL, he was called back up to New York. In his second game back, he registered his first NHL goal and went on to record his first career hat trick a couple weeks later. As a member of the Rangers, he played in the NHL All-Star game in 1991. In Turcotte's NHL career he played for the Rangers (1988-1993), Hartford Whalers (1993-1995), Winnipeg Jets (1995-1996), San Jose Sharks (1996-1997), St. Louis Blues (1997-1998), and Nashville Predators (1998-200). In 2000, Turcotte was forced to end his NHL career in Nashville due to injuries. In his 12-year NHL career, Turcotte recorded 411 points with 195 goals and 216 assists in 635 career games.

Post career
After finishing his career with the Nashville Predators, Turcotte stayed in middle Tennessee and founded the Southern Ice Lightning AAA Midget traveling team in Brentwood, Tennessee. While in Tennessee, Turcotte began coaching his son Devan's tyke house league team as well as his Elite midget 'AAA' team. After a few years in Tennessee, Turcotte returned to North Bay where he became the assistant coach for the Abitibi Eskimos of the Northern Ontario Junior Hockey League (NOJHL) in 2005–06. Shortly after, he became the head coach for the North Bay Skyhawks for two seasons. During his two seasons with the Skyhawks, Turcotte had a 41-28-1 record. Turcotte went on to be the assistant coach for the Nipissing Lakers men's hockey team from 2008-2011. When Nipissing gained a women's ice hockey team in 2012, Turcotte made the switch to coaching women's hockey. He also coached the North Bay Ice Boltz midget AA girls' team, taking them to the finals of a LLFHL championship tournament in 2012 and the Esso Cup national championship in 2013. Turcotte also coached the Team USA inline hockey team that won gold at the 2006 World Inline Tournament. Turcotte also went on to create hockey camps and skill development programs in his hometown of North Bay. On April 27, 2004, Turcotte was the 196th inductee into the North Bay Hockey Hall of Fame and on May 3, 2013, he received the Judge Harry J. Reynolds Memorial Trophy for his contribution to hockey in North Bay. Currently, he is the head coach of the Nipissing Lakers women's ice hockey program.

Personal life
Turcotte is married to Deb Turcotte and together they have three children.

International play
Turcotte represented the United States at the 1987 and 1988 World Junior Ice Hockey Championships and senior level at the 1993 Men's World Ice Hockey Championships.

Awards
 Played in NHL All-Star Game (1991)

Legacy
In the 2009 book 100 Ranger Greats, the authors ranked Turcotte at No. 86 all-time of the 901 New York Rangers who had played during the team's first 82 seasons.

Career statistics

Regular season and playoffs

International

References

External links

1968 births
Living people
American men's ice hockey centers
Canadian ice hockey centres
Colorado Rangers players
Denver Rangers players
Hartford Whalers players
Sportspeople from North Bay, Ontario
Nashville Predators players
National Hockey League All-Stars
New York Rangers draft picks
New York Rangers players
North Bay Centennials players
San Jose Sharks players
Winnipeg Jets (1979–1996) players
Ice hockey people from Ontario
Ice hockey people from Boston